Billy Teare is an Irish storyteller. Originally from Ballycarry, he now resides in Larne, County Antrim, Northern Ireland.

Teare has appeared on stage, TV, as an extra and walk on in drama productions for BBC Belfast directed by Danny Boyle. The big screen, in a movie called "Hidden Agenda' directed by Ken Loach, starring Frances MacDormand.  He also did performances in guises ranging from chicken hypnotist and stage hypnotist  to jester. In his teens he honed his audience skills, during a career on the Belfast comedy circuit, in a comedy duo called 'Willy & Art, The Mopheads.' They described themselves as Ireland's Morecombe & Wise. (What a cheek)

He resurrected his stand up act in the late 70's in talent shows in Belfast. Winning several, and then performing in clubs on either side of the divide and military camps throughout Northern Ireland as well as the odd gig in Scotland and England until 1990.

With a friend he opened Belfast's first mystical, new age shop and did Tarot readings. Traditional storytelling was pulling him in that direction.

He worked several Christmas seasons as a magic trick demonstrator for Marvyn's Magic. And also worked as a magical market trader and Tarot card reader at Ballycastle Lamas fair.

In the past thirty years, he has told stories in hundreds of early years settings, schools, libraries, community groups, council and cultural venues, as well as being a featured artist at many of the major folk and storytelling festivals around the world, including the far reaches of the Yukon. He incorporates songs, music, magic, juggling and other theatrical skills, to enliven a multi cultural feast of original, modern and traditional tales, monologues, rhymes, chants and audience participation.

Unique in using the critical thinking and recall inherent in stories, his treatment of narrative has proved highly successful for students and teachers alike.

In the past Teare has worked collaboratively with various other artists and groups, including BBC Northern Ireland and the Verbal Arts Centre, Derry.

Among his appearances have been: Storyteller in Residence, International Storytelling Centre, Tennessee, 2008, BBC Folk Proms event 2008, return performance at the Yukon International Storytelling Festival (2000, 2001, 2006), Beyond the Border: The Wales International Storytelling Festival (2005), The Toronto International Storytelling Festival, Sidmouth International Folk Festival (1999, 2001, 2003)

In 2013 Billy Teare co wrote a volume of 'Antrim Folk Tales' with Kathleen O'Sullivan, his storytelling partner for over seventeen years. The book was published by The History Press, Ireland. In 2020 stories from the book were included in 'The Anthology of Irish Folk Tales' also published by The History Press.

External links
 LONSAS
 NAWE/ARTSCAPE
 Poetry Ireland

Year of birth missing (living people)
Male comedians from Northern Ireland
Television writers from Northern Ireland
British male television writers
Living people